Maine School Administrative District 11 (MSAD 11) serves the communities of Gardiner, Pittston, Randolph and West Gardiner.

References

External links

11
Education in Kennebec County, Maine